Chicago Jewish Day School (CJDS) is a multi-denominational, progressive Jewish day school in Irving Park, Chicago, Illinois, serving over 200 students from junior kindergarten to grade eight.

Academics 

CJDS follows a dual curriculum, integrating Hebrew and Judaic studies with secular subjects. Students begin natural acquisition of the Hebrew language in Junior Kindergarten and Kindergarten and progress in their language abilities toward fluency as they move through the school. In addition to academic subjects, physical education, art, and music are part of the regular school day, and enrichment activities (After School Adventures) such as chess, cooking, and yoga are offered in the afternoon. On Fridays, they get out at 2:30 for Shabbat.

Programs 
Each year, grade eight students take a trip to Israel. They first go with Israel Now, and then take their own extension.

History 
CJDS opened in 2003 with seven students and has added one grade level per year until 2011. In 2012, CJDS held its inaugural graduation of our grade 8 class of five students. The school's founders included Orthodox Rabbi Asher Lopatin of Anshe Sholom B'nai Israel Congregation, Conservative Rabbi Michael Siegel of Anshe Emet Synagogue, and Reform Rabbi Aaron Mark Petuchowski of Temple Sholom. CJDS's multidenominational philosophy encourages the intentional inclusion of all Jewish identities. Students come from a wide variety of Jewish backgrounds, including but not limited to Reform, Reconstructionist, Conservative, Orthodox, and unaffiliated families.

New Campus 

CJDS was located in Edgewater and has moved to their new campus in the Irving Park neighborhood. It's a 2.6-acre campus, complete with multiple buildings, an on-site gymnasium, sports field, playgrounds, and outdoor basketball courts.

Affiliations and Accreditations 

CJDS has partnered with the Jewish United Fund and is accredited by the Independent Schools Association of the Central States (ISACS).

See also 
 History of the Jews in Chicago

References

External links

Jewish schools in the United States
Educational institutions established in 2003
Schools in Chicago
2003 establishments in Illinois